The following is a partial list of the "G" codes for Medical Subject Headings (MeSH), as defined by the United States National Library of Medicine (NLM).

This list continues the information at List of MeSH codes (G07). Codes following these are found at List of MeSH codes (G09). For other MeSH codes, see List of MeSH codes.

The source for this content is the set of 2006 MeSH Trees from the NLM.

– reproductive and urinary physiology

– reproduction

– clutch size

– coitus

– ejaculation

– embryonic and fetal development
  – embryonic development
  – cell lineage
  – embryo implantation
  – embryo implantation, delayed
  – embryonic induction
  – twinning, monozygotic
  – fetal development
  – fetal movement
  – fetal organ maturity
  – fetal viability
  – fetal weight
  – gestational age
  – organogenesis
  – sex differentiation

– estrous cycle
  – anestrus
  – diestrus
  – estrus
  – estrus synchronization
  – metestrus
  – proestrus

– fertility

– fertilization
  – ovum transport
  – sperm capacitation
  – sperm motility
  – sperm-ovum interactions
  – acrosome reaction
  – sperm transport

– gametogenesis
  – oogenesis
  – vitellogenesis
  – spermatogenesis
  – sperm maturation

– insemination
  – insemination, artificial

– maternal age

– menstrual cycle
  – fertile period
  – follicular phase
  – follicular atresia
  – luteal phase
  – menstruation
  – ovulation
  – anovulation
  – luteinization
  – corpus luteum maintenance
  – luteolysis
  – ovulation inhibition
  – superovulation

– orgasm

– oviparity

– oviposition

– ovoviviparity

– paternal age

– penile erection

– postpartum period
  – lactation
  – milk ejection

– pregnancy
  – gravidity
  – labor, obstetric
  – cervical ripening
  – labor onset
  – labor stage, first
  – labor stage, second
  – labor stage, third
  – trial of labor
  – uterine contraction
  – labor presentation
  – breech presentation
  – maternal age
  – pregnancy in adolescence
  – maternal-fetal exchange
  – parity
  – parturition
  – term birth
  – placentation
  – pregnancy, animal
  – litter size
  – pregnancy, high-risk
  – pregnancy maintenance
  – corpus luteum maintenance
  – pregnancy, multiple
  – quadruplets
  – quintuplets
  – superfetation
  – triplets
  – twins
  – twins, dizygotic
  – twins, monozygotic
  – pregnancy outcome
  – live birth
  – stillbirth
  – pregnancy rate
  – pregnancy trimesters
  – pregnancy trimester, first
  – pregnancy trimester, second
  – pregnancy trimester, third
  – pregnancy, unplanned
  – pregnancy, unwanted
  – prenatal nutrition
  – pseudopregnancy

– reproduction, asexual
  – parthenogenesis

– reproductive behavior
  – contraception behavior

– sex

– sex characteristics

– sex reversal, gonadal

– sexual behavior
  – coitus
  – coitus interruptus
  – courtship
  – extramarital relations
  – masturbation
  – prostitution
  – safe sex
  – sexual abstinence
  – sexual harassment
  – sexuality
  – bisexuality
  – heterosexuality
  – homosexuality
  – homosexuality, female
  – homosexuality, male
  – unsafe sex

– sexual development
  – climacteric
  – andropause
  – menopause
  – menopause, premature
  – perimenopause
  – postmenopause
  – premenopause
  – puberty
  – adrenarche
  – menarche
  – sex differentiation
  – sexual maturation

– viviparity, nonmammalian

– urinary tract physiology

– diuresis
  – natriuresis

– glomerular filtration rate

– kidney concentrating ability

– urination

– urodynamics

The list continues at List of MeSH codes (G09).

G08